Cottonwood Peak is a mountain in northwestern British Columbia, Canada, located in the Iverson Creek area. It is a volcanic feature of the Northern Cordilleran Volcanic Province that formed in the past 1.6 million years during the Pleistocene Epoch.

See also
List of volcanoes in Canada
List of Northern Cordilleran volcanoes
Volcanic history of the Northern Cordilleran Volcanic Province
Volcanism of Canada
Volcanism of Western Canada

References

One-thousanders of British Columbia
Volcanoes of British Columbia
Pleistocene volcanoes
Northern Cordilleran Volcanic Province